The Fourth Australian Recording Industry Association Music Awards (generally known as the ARIA Music Awards or simply The ARIAS) was held on 26 March 1990 at the Darling Harbour Convention Centre in Sydney. Australian host Glenn Shorrock of Little River Band was assisted by Quincy Jones, and other presenters, to distribute 24 awards. For the first time there were live performances but the awards were not televised.

The ARIA Hall of Fame inducted two artists: Percy Grainger and Sherbet. An "Outstanding Achievement Award" was awarded to Kylie Minogue.

Presenters and performers 

The ARIA Awards ceremony was hosted by singer-songwriter Glenn Shorrock. Presenters and performers were:

Awards

Final nominees for only some awards are available in reliable sources. Where not available, winners are listed.

ARIA Awards
Album of the Year 
Ian Moss – Matchbook
Kate Ceberano – Brave
Stephen Cummings – A New Kind of Blue
Hunters & Collectors – Ghost Nation
Paul Kelly & The Messengers – So Much Water So Close To Home
Single of the Year 
Peter Blakeley – "Crying in the Chapel"
Hunters & Collectors – "When The River Runs Dry"
Ian Moss – "Tucker's Daughter"
Max Q – "Way of the World"
The Black Sorrows – "Chained to the Wheel"
Highest Selling Album 
Diesel – Johnny Diesel & the Injectors
Highest Selling Single 
Kate Ceberano – "Bedroom Eyes"
Best Group 
The Black Sorrows – Hold On to Me
1927 – "Compulsory Hero"
Boom Crash Opera – These Here Are Crazy Times
Johnny Diesel & The Injectors – Johnny Diesel & the Injectors
Hunters & Collectors – Ghost Nation
Best Female Artist 
Kate Ceberano – Brave
Robyne Dunn – Labour of Liberty
Gyan – Gyan
Kylie Minogue – Enjoy Yourself
Jenny Morris – Shiver
Best Male Artist 
Ian Moss – Matchbook
Peter Blakeley – "Crying in the Chapel"
Joe Camilleri – "Angel Dove"
Stephen Cummings – A New Kind of Blue
Paul Kelly – So Much Water So Close To Home
Best New Talent 
Gyan – Gyan
The Hummingbirds – loveBUZZ
Martha's Vineyard – Martha's Vineyard
Tall Tales and True – Shiver
Tania Bowra – Heaven and Earth
Breakthrough Artist – Album
Ian Moss – Matchbook
Gyan – Gyan
Johnny Diesel & The Injectors – Johnny Diesel & The Injectors
The Hummingbirds – loveBUZZ
Max Q – Max Q
Breakthrough Artist – Single
Ian Moss – "Tucker's Daughter"
Girl Overboard – "I Can't Believe"
Gyan – "Wait"
The Hummingbirds – "Blush"
Max Q – "Way of the World"
Best Country Album 
John Williamson – Warragul
Slim Dusty & Anne Kirkpatrick – Two Singers, One Song
Ted Egan – This Land Australia
The Flying Emus – Postcards From Paradise
The Happening Thang – The Happening Thang
Best Independent Release 
Wild Pumpkins at Midnight – This Machine Is Made of People
Dubrovniks – Dubrovnik Blues
Girl Monstar – "Surfing on a Wave" / "He's Hell"
Sirocco – Port of Call
Various Artists – Rockin' Bethlehem
Best Indigenous Release 
Weddings Parties Anything – The Big Don't Argue
Coloured Stone – Wild Desert Rose
Gondwanaland – Wildlife
Scrap Metal – Broken Down Man
Yothu Yindi – Homeland Movement
Best Adult Contemporary Album 
Stephen Cummings – A New Kind of Blue
Dragon – Bondi Road
Not Drowning, Waving – Claim
Paul Kelly & The Messengers – So Much Water So Close To Home
John Williamson – Warragul
Best Comedy Release 
The D-Generation – The Satanic Sketches
The Comedy Company – Comedy Company Classics
Fast Forward – Fast Forward – Take One
Kevin Bloody Wilson – My Australian Roots
Roy Slaven – Rampaging Roy... The Life and Times of Roy Slaven

Fine Arts Awards
Best Jazz Album 
Paul Grabowsky Trio – Six by Three
Allan Browne – Genre Jumping Jazz
James Morrison – Swiss Encounter – Live at the Montreux Jazz Festival
Various Artists – Jim McLeod's Jazz Tracks
Vince Jones – Trustworthy Little Sweethearts
Best Classical Album 
Tasmanian Symphony Chamber Players – Vivaldi: The Four Seasons
Australian Youth Orchestra – Works by Koehne, Stravinsky, Messiaen, Ravel
Geoffrey Collins & David Miller – Flute Australia Volume 2
Jane Rutter – Nocturnes & Preludes for Flutes
Various Artists – Landscapes
Best Children's Album 
Various Artists – 0–9 Series
Don Spencer – Australia For Kids
Noni Hazlehurst & Sydney Symphony Orchestra – Peter and the Wolf/Carnival of the Animals
Peter Combe – Chopsticks
The Cast of Pugwall – Pugwall – Original Music from the Television Series
Best Original Soundtrack / Cast / Show Recording 
Original Cast Recording – Anything Goes
Australian Cast Recording – 42nd Street
Various Artists – Sons of Steel
Various Artists – Spirits of the Air, Gremlins of the Clouds
Various Artists – The Navigator

Artisan Awards
Song of the Year 
"Tucker's Daughter" (Ian Moss) – Ian Moss, Don Walker
"Chained to the Wheel" (The Black Sorrows) – Joe Camilleri, Nick Smith
"Crying in the Chapel" (Peter Blakeley) – Peter Blakeley, Aaron Zigman
"When the River Runs Dry" (Hunters and Collectors) – Mark Seymour, John Archer, Doug Falconer, Jack Howard, Robert Miles, Barry Palmer, Jeremy Smith, Michael Waters
"Careless" (Paul Kelly & The Messengers) – Paul Kelly
Producer of the Year
Andrew Farriss – Shiver – Jenny Morris
 Charles Fisher – 1927/Gyan – "Compulsory Hero"/Gyan
 Clive Martin, Hunters & Collectors – Ghost Nation – Hunters & Collectors
 Mark Moffatt – "Make Me Smile (Come Up and See Me)"/"Clever Man", "Calm and Crystal Clear"/"Raindance"/"Stuck on You"/"Washaway"/"You Got a Mirror", "Who Do You Take It To" – Nick Barker & the Reptiles/Neil Murray/Steve Hoy/Paul Norton/The Shivers/Ross Wilson
 Jeff Burstin, Joe Camilleri – "The Crack Up", "Chained to the Wheel" – The Black Sorrows
Engineer of the Year
 Alan Wright – "The Best Years of Our Lives", "I Am an Island"/"Touch the Fire"/"Save Me", "She Has to Be Loved"/"Simple Man" – Richard Clapton/Icehouse/Jenny Morris/Noiseworks
 Mark Moffatt – "Burn"/"The World Seems Difficult"/"Different Drum"/"Calm and Crystal Clear", "Clever Man" – Bell Jar/Mental as Anything/Flying Emus/Neil Murray
 "Onion Skin", "Get Out of the House!", "The Best Thing", "End Up Where I Started" – Boom Crash Opera
 Paula Jones – Max Q – Max Q
 Doug Brady – "Fire Down Below"/"Communication"/"I Can't Believe"/"Page One" – The Black Sorrows/John Farnham & Dani'Elle/Girl Overboard/David Hirschfelder
Best Video
Geoff Barter – "Compulsory Hero" – 1927
 "Onion Skin" – Boom Crash Opera
 "When the River Runs Dry" – Hunters & Collectors
 "Saved Me" – Jenny Morris
 "Sometimes" – Max Q
 "Spirits Song" – Meaningful Eye Contact
Best Cover Art 
Rob Miles – Hunters & Collectors – Ghost Nation
Greg O'Connor – These Here Are Crazy Times – Boom Crash Opera
Martin Fabinyi – Brave – Kate Ceberano
Deborah Parry Graphics / Ben Evans – 0–9 Series – Various Artists
Stephen Thomas – The Big Don't Argue – Weddings Parties Anything

Outstanding Achievement Award
Kylie Minogue

ARIA Hall of Fame inductees
The Hall of Fame inductees were:
Percy Grainger
Sherbet

References

External links
ARIA Awards official website
List of 1990 winners

1990 music awards
1990 in Australian music
ARIA Music Awards